City Hall Station is a Busan Metro Line 1 station in Yeonsan-dong, Yeonje District, Busan, South Korea.

Incidents
A fire started at the station at 5:14 pm on July 16, 2014. No one died, but five people were injured and over 400 had to be evacuated. The fire was caused by an external power supply air conditioner. The line resumed normal operations by 6:55 pm the same day.

Station Layout

Gallery

External links

  Cyber station information from Busan Transportation Corporation

Busan Metro stations
Yeonje District
Railway stations in South Korea opened in 1985